Arthur Morris was a key member of Donald Bradman's famous Australian cricket team, which toured England in 1948. The Australians went undefeated in their 34 matches; this unprecedented feat by a Test side touring England earned them the sobriquet The Invincibles.

A left-handed opening batsman, Morris played in all five Tests, partnering the right-handed Sid Barnes in three Tests—Barnes was injured for the other two Tests. As one of three on-tour selectors, Morris was a member of the leadership group along with Bradman and vice-captain Lindsay Hassett.

Morris ended the first-class tour with 1,922 runs at a batting average of 71.18 including seven centuries, recording the second highest aggregate behind Bradman. Morris' s form peaked in the Test series; he headed the runscoring aggregates and averages for all players with 696 runs at 87.00, and was the only player to compile three Test centuries. In the Second Test at Lord's, Morris struck 105 to set up Australia's first innings of 350 and eventual win. He scored 182 on a deteriorating pitch on the final day of the Fourth Test at Headingley, combining for a triple-century partnership with Bradman.  Australia scored 3/404 in the second innings to win by seven wickets, setting a world record for the highest successful run-chase in Test history. In the Fifth Test at The Oval, Morris scored 196, more than half of Australia's 389 as the tourists went on to win by an innings.

Based on his performance during the tour of England, Wisden Cricketers' Almanack named
Morris as one of their Cricketers of the Year in 1949. They described him as "one of the world's best left-hand batsmen".

Background
During the Australian season of 1947–48, which preceded the tour of England, Morris played in the first four Tests against the touring Indians, scoring 45 and an unbeaten 100 in the Third Test victory in Melbourne. He was omitted for the Fifth Test because the selectors wanted to trial other candidates for the 1948 tour of England. Morris ended the series with 209 runs at a batting average of 52.25, making him the third highest scorer as Australia won 4–0. During the series, he had opened with both Bill Brown, the veteran who had been a mainstay of Australian teams of the 1930s, and New South Wales teammate Sid Barnes. The Australian selectors chose Brown for the first two Tests against the Indians, but he struggled and made only 18 and 11—Australia batted once in both Tests—and was then dropped for Barnes, who made only 12 and 15 in the Third Test. Retained for the Fourth Test, Barnes made 112 in an Australian victory. Morris—whose place was secure—was rested for the Fifth Test to give Brown another chance to show that he was worthy of selection. Barnes made 33 while Brown made 99 run out as Australia completed a 4–0 series win. In the end, all three were selected for the England tour. As specialist opening batsmen, the trio were competing for the two opening positions in Bradman's first-choice team.

Morris—recently appointed co-captain of New South Wales—greatly impressed Australian captain Don Bradman, to the extent that Bradman made himself, Morris and vice-captain Lindsay Hassett the three on-tour selectors for the 1948 visit to England. Morris was a key part of Bradman's inner circle during the planning of the tour. Bradman had long harboured an ambition to tour England without losing a match; his team would become the first to achieve this feat, earning themselves the sobriquet, The Invincibles.

Early tour
Morris marked his first-class debut on English soil in the opening match of the tour, against Worcestershire. After the hosts had batted first and made 233, Morris stroked with a fluent 138 (including 19 fours) from 275 minutes. He put on an opening stand of 79 with Sid Barnes, before adding 186 for the second wicket with Bradman. Australia declared at 8/462 before completing an innings victory. Morris and Bradman's scoring matched one another during their partnership and both were close to being the first Australian century-maker on the tour. The former was on 95 and took three runs to move to 98, before Bradman hit consecutive fours to progress from 91 to 99. The Australian captain failed to score for the rest of the over, so Morris took the strike in the next over and reached his century before Bradman followed suit. After reaching triple figures, Morris added his last 38 runs in 50 minutes. Morris's role indicated his standing alongside Barnes as a first-choice opener, as Australia customarily selected its strongest team for the tour opener. The third opener taken on tour, Bill Brown, played out of position in the middle order.

Morris was rested from the second tour match, which was against Leicestershire; Bradman's team won by an innings. He returned against Yorkshire, and in a low-scoring match on a damp pitch favouring slower bowling, made 17 and three as Australia won by only four wickets. The match saw 324 runs scored for the loss of 35 wickets and a top-score of only 34. Morris's 17 in the first innings was actually the fourth highest score for the entire match. The match was the closest Australia came to defeat for the whole tour; the tourists were 6/31 in pursuit of the target of 60, with effectively only three wickets in hand because Sam Loxton was injured and unable to bat. The Australians travelled to London to play Surrey at The Oval. In the first hour of play, Australia's openers played solidly and rarely missed a ball. Morris scored 65 as he and Barnes put on an opening stand of 136, which laid the foundation for Australia's 632. The tourists went on to win the match by an innings. In the next fixture, Morris managed only 26 as Australia piled on 4/414 declared against Cambridge University. Morris bowled for the first time on tour, sending down five wicketless overs for 11 runs as Australia completed their second innings victory in succession.

Morris was rested as Australia crushed Essex by an innings and 451 runs, their largest winning margin for the summer. During the match, the Australian batsmen set a world record by scoring 721 runs on the first day, a new world record for the most runs in one day of first-class cricket. Morris returned for the innings victory against Oxford University, putting on an opening stand of 138 with Brown before being run out for 64. Former Australian Test batsman Jack Fingleton reported that Hubert Webb "brilliantly ran out Morris from the boundary with a throw over the stumps". Australia amassed 431 and won completed their fourth consecutive innings victory. In the hosts' second innings, Morris took his first wicket of the tour, bowling Indian Test batsman Abdul Hafeez Kardar to end with 1/6 from three overs.

The next match was against the Marylebone Cricket Club (MCC) at Lord's. The MCC fielded seven players who would represent England in the Tests, and were basically a full strength Test team, while Australia fielded their strongest possible team. Morris and Barnes retained their positions at the top of the order, while Brown played out of position in the middle order. It was a chance to players from both sides to gain a psychological advantage ahead of the Tests, but Morris looked uncomfortable, managing only five as Australia amassed 552 and enforced the follow on to win by an innings. In the MCC's second innings, Morris caught Jim Laker from the bowling of Colin McCool. The Lord's fixture was followed by Australia's first non-victory of the tour, which was against Lancashire. Morris continued to struggle, making five and 22, falling twice to England Test paceman Dick Pollard, In the drawn match against Nottinghamshire, Morris continued his form slump, making 16 in the tourists' only innings.

Morris found batting difficult for the first few weeks of the tour, as he struggled to adapt to the unfamiliar batting conditions. He reached 50 only twice in the nine innings after the Worcestershire match, totalling only 223 runs at 24.77; Morris sometimes attempted to drive balls pitched just short of a good length, and if they reared suddenly, he was liable to be caught. Morris was worried about edging the ball to the slips cordon and had become fidgety and shuffled across the crease.

After being rested for the eight-wicket win over Hampshire, Morris rectified his technical problem, and success followed against Sussex. After the hosts had been rolled for 86 in their first innings, Morris dominated an opening partnership of 153 with Brown, who made only 44 before becoming the first man to fall. Morris added a further 189 for the second wicket with Bradman before he fell for 184 at 2/342. He had struck 26 fours, laying the platform for Australia's total of 5/549 declared and eventual innings victory. He was to hit five more first-class centuries before the end of the season.

First Test

Morris thus headed into the First Test at Trent Bridge with a century under his belt. He held his position at the top of the order along with Barnes, while Brown played out of position in the middle order. Morris bowled three overs for four runs in the first innings as England were bowled out for 165 on the first day after winning the toss and electing to bat. During the innings, Morris took a reflex catch when Godfrey Evans hit a ball strongly, directly to him at short leg to leave England at 7/74.

Australia survived the last 15 minutes on the first evening to reach stumps on 0/17, with Morris on 10. Barnes and Morris took the score to 73 before the latter was bowled by Jim Laker's off spin for 31. Barnes batted confidently, while the hesitant Morris shuffled around the crease. At one stage, Morris scored only seven runs in 55 minutes, During this period, Morris unnecessarily played at a ball outside off stump from seamer Alec Bedser and edged it to wicket-keeper Evans, who dropped the catch. He recomposed himself and hit left arm orthodox spinner Jack Young's first ball—a full toss—for runs as Australia passed 50 without loss. Morris fell when he tried to force a ball from Laker away, but hit it from the middle of his bat into his back pad; the ball rebounded onto the stumps. Australia went on to amass 509, and when England batted again, they lost their third wicket at 150. Joe Hardstaff junior came in, and on the third ball he aimed a cut that went low to second slip, just as he did in the first innings. However, Morris dropped the catch. Hardstaff exploited his second chance to make 43 before falling at 4/243.

Australia eventually bowled England out for 441, leaving them a target of 98 on the final day. Bradman's openers progressed quickly at the start of the chase. Barnes took 13 runs from the opening over by Bedser, but Morris again lacked fluency. Australia reached 38 from 32 minutes when Bedser bowled Morris for nine, but the tourists steadied to reach their target with eight wickets in hand. After bowling several balls that moved away, Bedser caught out Morris with an inswinger. Morris had developed a habit of trying to defend the ball to the leg side while shuffling towards the off, and was not in a position to deal with a ball that hurried off the pitch. Following the match, Fingleton criticised Morris, feeling that he was shuffling across the crease too much instead of playing from the back foot.

In the match immediately after the First Test, Morris scored 60 against Northamptonshire, putting on 122 runs with Lindsay Hassett as Australian completed an innings win. He was then rested ahead of the Second Test as Australia drew with Yorkshire at Bramall Lane in Sheffield.

Second Test

In the Second Test at Lord's, Australia elected to bat first and England made an ideal start. The debutant Alec Coxon opened the bowling and removed Barnes for a duck in his second over to leave the tourists at 1/3. England restricted the Australians in the first hour and created several near misses, particularly against Bradman, who nervous early on. In contrast, Morris was playing fluently and scored many runs from the back cut. At the end of the pace bowlers' opening spells, the leg spin of Doug Wright was introduced and Australia cut loose. Wright bowled a no-ball that Morris dispatched over the leg side fence for six, before hitting another ball for four. Bradman and Morris settled down as Coxon and Wright operated steadily, although the latter was able to extract substantial spin, hitting Morris in the stomach with a ball that turned in sharply from outside off stump. At lunch, Australia were 1/82 with Morris on 45 and Bradman on 35.

Shortly afterwards, with the score at 87, Bradman was caught for the third consecutive time in Tests in Bedser's leg trap. Len Hutton—who took the catch—had dropped Bradman in the same position when the Australian captain was on 13. At the other end, Morris began to take control. He drove the ball through the covers and clipped it off his pads through the leg side. Morris reached his century with consecutive boundaries from Coxon. Fingleton called the innings "a pretty Test century in the grandest of all cricket settings". This ended a run of poor form for Morris, a period during which he had shuffled uncertainly on the crease without moving forward or back decisively. O'Reilly called it Morris's best Test century to date, as this was the strongest English attack he had faced during his career, and because of the loss of wickets at the other end. O'Reilly said Morris had been disciplined in not playing loose shots outside off stump and missing or edging them, yet still being able to score quickly at every opportunity. Morris was out soon after for 105 from 166 balls, after hitting Coxon to Hutton in the gully to leave Australia at 3/166. His innings included 14 fours and one six, and was noted for powerful, well-placed cover drives. With Morris gone, Australia fell to 7/258 at stumps, before the lower order counterattacked on the second morning and took the total to 350. Bradman's team took a 135-run lead after dismissing England for 215.

The weather was fine as Australia started their second innings on the third morning. The Australian openers took a cautious approach to begin with, avoiding the hook shot and not playing at balls that were not going to hit the stumps, looking for a solid start. Both openers were given early reprieves. Barnes survived a stumping opportunity when he was 18. Laker came on and induced Morris into hitting an airborne ball back down the pitch, but he was slow to react to the possibility of a caught and bowled. According to O'Reilly, most other bowlers would have been able to reach the ball and attempt a catch. The openers took advantage to combine for an opening stand of 122. Wright came on and again bowled a no-ball at the start of his spell, which Morris lofted into the crowd for six. After shuffling around with uncertainty at the start of his innings, Morris began to play more fluently. He was eventually bowled for 62, knocking a ball from Wright onto his stumps. The opening partnership laid the platform for Australia's 7/460 declared, which allowed them to set an imposing target of 596 and win by 409 runs to take a 2–0 series lead.

Morris was rested by Bradman for the second match against Surrey, which started the day after the Test and ended in a ten-wicket victory for the Australians. The following match was against Gloucestershire at Bristol, and in only five hours on the first day, Morris scored his career best of 290. Having lost the first two Tests, England were contemplating changes to their team: Tom Goddard was earmarked to replace Jim Laker as the off spinner after performing strongly in county cricket, while Laker had struggled in the Second Test. The English hoped Goddard would be the strike bowler to cut through Australia's strong batting line-up. Morris's assault ended Goddard's hopes of Test selection. His innings was highlighted by his quick assessment of the length of the ball, followed by decisive footwork. Morris confidently advanced out of the crease when the ball was of a full length to drive and rocked onto the back foot to and cut if Goddard dropped short. Unable to contain Morris, Goddard packed the leg side field and bowled outside leg stump. Morris responded by stepping down the wicket towards the leg side, charging the bowler and repeatedly lofting the ball inside out over the off side. He reached his century before lunch and his 200 by the tea interval. By the time Morris was dismissed, he had struck 40 fours and a six. He put on stands of 102 with Barnes, 136 with Keith Miller and 162 with Neil Harvey before falling with the score at 4/466. Fingleton said "Morris flayed it [the home team's bowling] in all directions", while former English Test paceman Maurice Tate said "Tom [Goddard] is not used to batsmen using their feet to him ... the county batsmen diddle and diddle [shuffle about indecisively instead of quickly moving into position and attacking] to him and that gets him many wickets." Australia amassed 5/560 on the first day before declaring at 7/774, their largest score of the tour and the second highest by any Australian team on English soil. Morris took a match total of 1/35 as Australia won by an innings.

Third Test

Following his effort in Bristol, Morris proceeded to the Third Test at Old Trafford. England batted first and made 363. During the innings, Barnes was hit in the kidneys by a Dick Pollard pull shot while fielding at short leg. When Australia started their first innings reply, Barnes was still recuperating after being carried from the field and taken to hospital for a medical examination.

Having dropped Brown for the Test, Barnes's injury left Australia with only Morris as a specialist opener. Off spinner Ian Johnson was deployed as Australia's makeshift second opener. He was unable to make an impact, as Bedser removed him for one, before Pollard trapped Bradman leg before wicket (lbw) to leave Australia at 2/13. The tourists were pinned down as Pollard bowled 17 consecutive overs from his long run, aiming at leg stump. Pollard was reinforced by Bedser, who bowled unchanged for 90 minutes. Morris and Hassett rebuilt the innings, adding 69 for the third wicket in 101 minutes before the latter fell. Miller joined Morris and the pair took the score to 3/126 at stumps, with the latter—who had been the more sedate in the partnership—on 48.

Australia struggled against the new ball in the first hour of the day three. Miller played and missed three times in one over before being trapped lbw for 31; the tourists added only nine runs in the first hour. Four runs later, Morris reached 51 and fell to Bedser, leaving Australia at 5/139. It had been a slow morning for Morris—he took 21 minutes to add a single to his overnight total and reached 50 after taking another 24 minutes to register his second run of the day. Australia fell for 221, narrowly avoiding the follow on, and England declared at 3/174 on the last morning after many rain delays. This left Bradman's team with a victory target of 317, but the rain kept falling and the entire morning was lost.

Play finally began after the tea, and the pitch played very slowly because of the excess moisture. As Australia had no intention of chasing the runs, England captain Norman Yardley often installed seven men in close catching positions. In the first half-hour, the tourists showed little attacking intent and scored only six runs. Johnson then fell for six to leave Australia at 1/10. Bradman came to the crease and played 11 balls without scoring while Morris scored two streaky fours from Bedser. Yardley used his spinners for an hour, while Morris and Bradman made little effort to score. For 105 minutes, Morris stayed at one end and Bradman at the other; neither looked to rotate the strike by taking singles. The Australian skipper faced only eight balls from Morris's main end, and at one point was so startled when his partner wanted a single that he sent him back. Thereafter, the tourists batted steadily and defensively to ensure a draw. They ended at 1/92 from 61 overs, a run rate of 1.50, with 35 maidens; this was the slowest innings run rate for the series to date. Morris finished unbeaten on 54, his fourth consecutive half-century during the Test series. The match finally ended after a series of periodic rain interruptions.

Morris struck 109 against Middlesex in the following tour match at Lord's. The hosts batted first and made 203, and Australia stumbled to 3/53 before Morris combined with Sam Loxton (123) for a 172-run fourth-wicket stand. Australia recovered to reach 317 and went on to a ten-wicket win. Morris's century meant he had amassed 504 runs in just over a week of cricket.

Fourth Test

The Fourth Test at Headingley in Leeds saw Morris at his finest; England elected to bat and started strongly with 496 in the first innings, their highest score of the series. On a placid pitch, Morris was one of seven bowlers used as Bradman sought a breakthrough; each of the first three wickets put on century partnerships. Bill Edrich hit a long hop from Morris's left arm unorthodox spin to the boundary to reach his century, before Bedser lifted him high over square leg for six. This prompted Bradman to replace Morris after he conceded 20 runs in five overs as England reached 2/423. Edrich was out when he attempted to pull Johnson to the on side in the large gap between mid-on and square leg, but only hit it in the air to Morris, who completed the catch diving forwards at wide mid-on to leave the score at 4/426, before England collapsed to 496.

England took a 38-run lead after Australia replied with 458. Morris contributed only six while batting with vice-captain Lindsay Hassett, who had been promoted from the middle order to open while Barnes was still injured; Bradman had overlooked reserve opener Brown. Morris chipped Bedser in the air to Ken Cranston at mid-wicket to leave Australia at 1/13. Australia slumped to 3/68 before a middle-order fightback took Australia to 458 early on the fourth morning. England declared at 8/365 early on the fifth morning, leaving Australia to chase 404 runs for victory. Batting into the final day allowed Yardley the right to ask the groundsman to use a heavy roller, which would help to break up the wicket and make the surface more likely to spin and bounce unevenly.

At the time, 404 would have been the highest ever fourth innings score to result in a Test victory for the batting side. Australia had only 345 minutes to reach their target, and the local press wrote them off, predicting that they would be dismissed by lunchtime on a deteriorating wicket expected to favour spin bowlers. Morris and Hassett started slowly, scoring only six runs in the first six overs on a pitch offering spin and bounce. It appeared they were playing carefully at first before deciding whether to try to achieve the target at a later point. In Bedser's second over, the third of the innings, Morris chipped the ball in the air towards mid-wicket, in a similar manner to his first innings dismissal, but this time the ball evaded Cranston. After 15 minutes, Australia had only made 0/10.

After Bedser had bowled three overs, Laker replaced him in the seventh over as Yardely attempted to exploit the turning surface, but 13 runs were taken from his first over. Hassett hit a four and took a single to rotate the strike. Later in the over, Morris hit a four, was beaten by a bouncing ball that hurried off the pitch, before striking another boundary. Despite the expensive Laker over, only 44 runs came in the first hour, meaning that the tourists still needed 360 runs from 285 minutes. The crowd heckled the Australian openers for their slow scoring and they applauded ironically after Morris took a single. After his poor first over, Laker had settled down and conceded only two runs from his next six overs, and "was getting at least one ball every over to turn considerably".

In an attempt to exploit the worn surface, Yardley brought on the part-time left-arm unorthodox spin of Compton to partner Laker. The occasional bowler was inaccurate and Morris struck two fours in his first over to bring up Australia's 50 in 64 minutes. However, Compton's deceived Morris—who danced down the pitch and missed the ball—in the next over, but Evans fumbled the stumping opportunity with the batsman on 32 and Australia at 0/55. Laker beat Morris in the following over with an off break that spun a foot, before Compton removed Hassett for 17 with the score at 57.

Bradman joined Morris with 347 runs needed in 271 minutes. The Australian captain signalled his intentions by reaching 12 in only six minutes. Yardley then called upon the occasional leg spin of Hutton in an attempt to exploit the turning wicket. However, Hutton did not bowl regularly so he had trouble in maintaining his consistency. Morris promptly joined Bradman in the counter-attack, hitting three consecutive fours to reach 51 during Hutton's first over, which Fingleton described as "rather terrible" due to the errant length. Bradman took two fours off Hutton's next over before almost hitting a catch. However, the 20 runs from Hutton's two inaccurate overs had allowed Australia to reach 1/96 from 90 minutes.

In the next over, Compton greatly troubled Bradman, who edged two balls and was dropped once. At the other end, Morris continued to take advantage of Hutton's inaccurate leg breaks, and Australia reached lunch at 1/121, with the opener on 63 and his captain on 35. Hutton had conceded 30 runs in four overs, and in the half-hour preceding the interval, Australia had added 64 runs. Although Australia had scored at a reasonable rate, they had also been troubled by many of the deliveries and were expected to face further difficulty if they were to avoid defeat.

Upon resumption, Compton continued as Yardley persisted with his policy of trying to exploit the deteriorating pitch with as much spin as possible. Compton was not a regular bowler and sent down a series of full tosses and long hops that were easily dispatched for runs. Morris struck seven fours in two overs of what Fingleton called "indescribably bad bowling". This sequence included six fours in eight balls. As Morris continued to attack, Compton began to crack under the pressure and his accuracy worsened. Compton had generated trouble for the batsmen by tossing the ball up and beating the bat or inducing edges, but Morris counterattacked with drives. Compton tried to hold back his length to avoid being driven, but the Australian opener pounced on the shorter balls. Morris reached the 90s just 14 minutes after the interval and hit another boundary to reach his century in just over two hours. Morris had added 37 runs since lunch, while Bradman had furthered his total by only three.

The Australian onslaught against the spinners prompted Yardley to take the new ball and replace Compton with his fast men. Bradman reached 50 in 60 minutes and Yardley dropped him soon after. Australia reached 202—halfway to the required total—with 165 minutes remaining, after Morris dispatched consecutive full tosses from Laker to the fence. Bradman then hooked two boundaries, but suffered a fibrositis attack, which put him in significant pain. Drinks were taken during a delay for treatment, and Morris had to shield Bradman from the strike until the skipper's pain had subsided. Australia reached 250 shortly before tea, with Morris on 133 and Bradman on 92. Bradman then reached his century as the second-wicket stand passed 200.

Morris was given another life on 136, when Laker dropped him at square leg from the bowling of Compton. Bradman was given another life at 108; he advanced two metres down the pitch towards Laker and missed, but Evans fumbled the stumping opportunity. Australia reached tea at 1/292 with Morris on 150. The pair had added 171 during the session. Morris was eventually dismissed by Yardley for 182, after hitting a tired-looking shot to mid-off, having partnered Bradman for a stand of 301 in 217 minutes. He struck 33 fours in 290 minutes of batting. Australia still needed 46 for victory, and went on to win by seven wickets with 15 minutes to spare, setting a new world record for the highest successful Test run-chase.

Morris was rested for the match against Derbyshire immediately after the Headingley Test, which Australia won by an innings, as well as the next match against Glamorgan, which was a rain-affected draw. He returned to score 32 and 20 not out as Australia defeated Warwickshire by nine wickets. Australia faced Lancashire for the second time on the tour; Morris made 49 and 16 as the match ended in a draw. Morris and Barnes put on 123 in the first innings, but their teammates were unable to build on the platform and Australia ended on 321. Morris was rested from the non-first-class match against Durham, which was a rain-affected draw.

Fifth Test

Australia proceeded to The Oval for the Fifth Test. England won the toss and elected to bat on a pitch affected by heavy rain prior to the match. With the score at 2/17, Lindwall bowled a bouncer, which Compton hooked. Morris ran from his position at short square leg to take a difficult catch, described by Fingleton as "one of the catches of the season". England collapsed to be all out for 52 as Australia's pacemen extracted bounce and movement from the pitch.

In contrast, Australia batted with ease, as the overcast skies cleared and sun came out. The debutant Allan Watkins opened the bowling, delivering four overs for 19 runs before the after-effects of a Lindwall blow to the shoulder became too much. The openers passed England's first innings total with ease in less than an hour, and Australia reached 100 at 17:30, with Barnes on 52 and Morris on 47. The tourists reached 117 before Barnes fell to Eric Hollies for 61, ending an opening stand that had been compiled in only 126 minutes. This brought Bradman to the crease late on the first day. As the Australian captain had already announced his retirement after the end of the series, the innings would be his last in Test cricket if Australia batted only once. The crowd gave him a standing ovation as he walked out to the wicket. Yardley led the Englishmen in giving Bradman three cheers, before shaking his hand. The Australian captain needed only four runs for a Test average of 100, but was bowled by Hollies for a second ball duck with a googly that went between bat and pad. Bradman received another large round of applause as he left the arena.

Hassett came in at 2/117 and together with Morris saw Australia to the close at 2/153. Morris was unbeaten on 77, having hooked Hollies for two fours just before stumps. On the second morning, Morris registered his third century of the Test series and his sixth in Ashes matches. The innings had taken 208 minutes and included four fours. Hassett and Morris took the score to 226 before their 109-run stand was broken when Young trapped the former for 37. As the Australians had dismissed their hosts cheaply on the first day and were already well in the lead, they had plenty of time to complete a victory, so Hassett and Morris had no need to take undue risks and scored at a sedate pace. The following batsmen were unable to establish themselves at the crease. Miller made five, before Harvey came to the crease and hit two quick boundaries before being dismissed. Hollies took both wickets.

Loxton came in and accompanied Morris for 39 further runs before falling to Edrich. Lindwall fell for nine before Morris was finally removed for 196, ending an innings noted for his hooking and off-driving. It took a run out to remove Morris; he attempted a quick run after the ball was hit to third man. Morris was called through for a run by Don Tallon, but he was too slow for the substitute fielder Reg Simpson's arm. Australia went on to finish with 389. Morris had scored more than half the runs as the rest of the team struggled against the leg spin of Hollies, who took 5/131. Hollies tossed the ball up repeatedly, coaxing the Australians into attacking balls that spun after pitching on off stump. Morris took four catches for the match as Australia took victory by an innings and 149 runs, sealing a 4–0 Test series triumph.

Later tour matches
Seven matches remained on Bradman's quest to go through a tour of England without defeat. Australia batted first against Kent and Morris made 43 in a total of 361 before Australia enforced the follow on and completed an innings victory. Morris was rested for the following three matches against the Gentlemen of England, Somerset and the South of England. The first two matches were won by innings while the third was washed out after Australia took a large first-innings lead. In the meantime, Morris underwent minor surgery for a split in his hand.

Australia's biggest challenge in the post-Test tour matches was against the Leveson-Gower's XI, named after H. D. G. Leveson-Gower. During the last tour in 1938, this team was effectively a full-strength England outfit, but this time Bradman insisted only six current Test players be allowed to play for the hosts. After his demands were met, Bradman named a full-strength team. After the tourists dismissed the home team for 177, Morris made 62 in a 102-run opening stand with Barnes before Yardley bowled him. Australia declared at 8/489 and time ran out with Leveson-Gower's XI at 2/75 after multiple rain delays.

The tour ended with two non-first-class matches against Scotland. In the first match, Morris was the mainstay of the innings, scoring 112 as Australia batted first and made 236. The Scots replied with 85 and were forced to follow on. Morris led the wicket-taking in the second innings, taking 5/10 from five overs as the hosts fell for 111 to hand the Australians an innings victory. He continued his success in the second match, taking three of Scotland's first four batsmen to end with 3/17 as the hosts fell for 178. Batting at No. 7, Morris made 10 as Australia declared at 6/407 and bowled four overs for eight runs without taking a wicket as Bradman's men ended the tour with another innings victory.

Role

A left-handed opening batsman, Morris played in all five Tests, partnering the right-handed Sid Barnes in three Tests; Barnes was injured in the Third and Fourth Tests. Barnes was unable to open in the former and did not play in the latter. Three opening batsmen were taken on the tour, with Bill Brown being the reserve. During the tour matches, which were usually played consecutively with only one or no days between fixtures, Bradman rotated the trio, so one would generally be rested while the other two opened. Notable exceptions occurred in the Test series and the opening match against Worcestershire and the clash against the MCC. In those matches, Australia fielded its first-choice team; Brown played out of position in the middle order, while Morris and Barnes opened. A very occasional left-arm unorthodox spin bowler, Morris delivered only 35 overs during the first-class matches, including eight in the Tests. He took two wickets, both outside the Test arena.

Morris ended the first-class matches with 1,922 runs at 71.18 including seven centuries, ranking him second in runs only to Bradman (2,428 at 89.92) and substantially ahead of third-placed Hassett (1,563 at 74.42). He did so despite being troubled by a split between the first and second fingers of his left hand, caused by constant jarring from the bat as he played the ball. The wound often opened while he was batting, forcing him to undergo a minor operation which sidelined him from some matches in the latter part of the tour.

In recognition of his performances, Morris was named as one of the five Wisden Cricketers of the Year in 1949. Wisden described him as "one of the world's best left-hand batsmen". Neville Cardus—his former critic—praised Morris's performance during The Invincibles tour as "masterful, stylish, imperturbable, sure in defence, quick and handsome in stroke play. His batting is true to himself, charming and good mannered but reliant and thoughtful."

Morris's form peaked in The Ashes, heading the Test averages and aggregates with 696 runs at 87.00. Bradman (502 at 72.57) and Denis Compton (562 at 62.44) were the next closest; nobody else scored more than 360 runs. He was the only player to compile three Test centuries, and added three further fifties.

Notes

Statistical note

n-[1]

This statement can be verified by consulting all of the scorecards for the matches, as listed here.

General notes

References

 

The Invincibles (cricket)